Hank Brian Marvin (born Brian Robson Rankin, 28 October 1941) is an English multi-instrumentalist, vocalist and songwriter. He is widely known as the lead guitarist for the Shadows, a group which primarily performed instrumentals and was the backing band for Cliff Richard, and subsequently for Marvin, Welch & Farrar.

Early life and career
Hank Marvin was born Brian Robson Rankin in Newcastle upon Tyne, England. As a child he played banjo and piano. After hearing Buddy Holly he decided to learn the guitar and also adopted Holly-style dark-rimmed glasses.

He chose his stage name while launching his career. It is an amalgamation of his childhood nickname, Hank, which he used to differentiate himself from friends also named Brian, and the first name of Marvin Rainwater, the country and rockabilly singer.

He moved to London in April 1958 after persuading his parents to let him do so in pursuit of a career in the music business. Sixteen-year-old Marvin and his Rutherford Grammar School friend, Bruce Welch, met Johnny Foster, Cliff Richard's manager, at The 2i's Coffee Bar in Soho, London. Foster was looking for a guitarist for Cliff Richard's UK tour and was considering Tony Sheridan. Instead he offered Marvin the position. Marvin agreed to join the Drifters, as Cliff Richard's group was then known, provided there was a place for Welch.

Marvin met Richard for the first time at a nearby Soho tailor's shop, where Richard was having a fitting for a pink stage jacket. The Drifters had their first rehearsal with Richard at the Webb family home (Cliff's parents) in Cheshunt, Hertfordshire. After a threat of legal action by representatives of the American band of the same name, the Drifters became The Shadows in 1959.

Solo career

His first critically lauded, self-titled solo album of instrumentals, which featured guitar set to orchestrated backing, was released in 1969, following the first disbanding of the Shadows, in late 1968. The single "Sacha" topped the singles chart in New South Wales, Australia, having been 'discovered' by two DJs at 2WG Wagga Wagga. Marvin's solo career was then suspended due to Shadows reunions, first for a Far East tour and 'live' album in 1969, then a studio album in 1970 (Shades of Rock) and again in the early 1970s. He has experimented with styles and material, doing instrumental albums, some with mostly vocals (e.g. Words and Music, All Alone With Friends), one with only acoustic guitars and one with a guitar orchestra (The Hank Marvin Guitar Syndicate).

In 1970, Marvin and Welch formed Marvin, Welch & Farrar, a vocal-harmony trio which failed to appeal to Shadows fans or to contemporary music fans. They became 'Marvin & Farrar' for a vocal album in 1973 and then reverted to the Shadows in late 1973, for the instrumental Rockin' with Curly Leads album. The Shadows came second for the United Kingdom in the 1975 Eurovision Song Contest with "Let Me Be the One".

Marvin wrote "Driftin'", "Geronimo", "Spider Juice" (his daughter's name for orange juice), "I Want You to Want Me" for the Shadows, and "The Day I Met Marie". He co-wrote Richard's 1961 hit; "Gee Whizz It's You" with Ian Samwell. With Welch, Brian Bennett, and John Rostill, he wrote hits for Cliff Richard, including; "On the Beach", "I Could Easily Fall in Love with You", "Time Drags By", and "In the Country".

In 1969 and 1970, he teamed with Richard for: two 'Cliff & Hank' hit singles, his own song; "Throw Down a Line" (also recorded by Marvin, Welch & Farrar), and "The Joy of Living", while Richard also had a hit with his ecology song, "Silvery Rain". "Silvery Rain" was covered by Olivia Newton-John on her 1981 album Physical.

In 1977, Marvin played lead guitar on Roger Daltrey's third solo album, One of the Boys, on the tracks Parade and Leon. He co-wrote Olivia Newton-John's 1977 hit 'Sam' with John Farrar and Don Black, and produced albums for the British showman Des O'Connor.

In 1988, Marvin collaborated with French keyboardist and composer Jean Michel Jarre on the track "London Kid", on Jarre's Revolutions album and was a guest in Jarre's Destination Docklands concert at London's Royal Victoria Dock. Jarre said the Shadows' success had influenced him and led to his decision to devote his career to instrumental music.

Marvin appeared with Leslie Nielsen in an advert for Red Rock Cider, which was done as a parody of Nielsen's Police Squad! films. In a bar scene, Nielsen calls out, "Hey, you over there, in the shadows!", after which Marvin steps forward. When Nielsen asks Marvin to "accompany" him (police talk for taking someone down to the station), Marvin literally accompanies him, on the guitar, as Nielsen sings the product's jingle.

In 1992, Duane Eddy guested on Marvin's album Into the Light on the track "Pipeline".

His 2002 solo tour of the United Kingdom was billed as the Guitar Player Tour (The Final Tour). Marvin and the Shadows reformed for a 2004 Final Tour, and a 2005 European tour was also undertaken. Cliff Richard and the Shadows performed the final tour dates in 2009 and 2010.

Marvin dueted twice with French guitarist Jean-Pierre Danel on his 2007 and 2010 albums, both top-ten hits and certified gold. Their two singles hit the iTunes charts in France, Norway, Finland and Germany, and later (when released as an EP from Danel's compilation The Hit List) in Ireland, United Kingdom, Poland, United States, South Africa and Thailand. Marvin also participated on one of his DVDs and wrote the foreword for Danel's book about the Fender Stratocaster.

While Welch and Bennett became the Officers of the Order of the British Empire (OBE) in the 2004 Queen's Birthday Honours List for services to music, Marvin declined for "personal reasons".

On 28 October 2009, Marvin was presented with a BASCA Gold Badge Award in recognition of his unique contribution to music.

He has continued to release instrumental solo albums, all of which have reached the UK Top 10 album charts since 2002. His latest solo album, Without a Word, was released in 2017.

Personal life
His first wife was Beryl, with whom he had four children. He is currently married to Carole, with whom he had two children.

Since 1986, Marvin has lived in Perth, Western Australia. He has made impromptu appearances on stage when musician friends visit the area, such as in February 2013 when Cliff Richard held a concert at Sandalford Winery. He is a Jehovah's Witness. Marvin runs a recording studio, Nivram studios, part of Sh-Boom studios in Tiverton Street, Perth, owned by Trevor Spencer and Gary Taylor. He has also developed a keen interest in the music of jazz guitar legend Django Reinhardt and performs regularly with his group, "Hank Marvin's Gypsy Jazz", whose repertoire consists of a mix of Reinhardt originals and new tunes composed in the gypsy jazz genre.

Style and influence
According to Guitar.com, "In 1960 [Marvin] defined the role of 'lead guitarist'" and "became the first British 'guitar hero'". The website continued, "Hank is legendary for his expressive phrasing, but rather than use his Strat's controls to accentuate volume swells, he prefers to use a pedal to give that vocal quality to his lines." Marvin influenced many British rock guitarists, including George Harrison, Eric Clapton, David Gilmour, Brian May, Mark Knopfler, Peter Frampton, Steve Howe, Roy Wood, Tony Iommi, Pete Townshend, Jeff Beck and Jimmy Page. Australian guitar virtuoso Tommy Emmanuel has also paid homage to Marvin on various recordings.

In 1959, Cliff Richard purchased a fiesta red Fender Stratocaster for Marvin to use on stage, which is widely claimed to be the first Stratocaster in the United Kingdom. Although it allegedly still belongs to Richard, it has been in the possession of Bruce Welch since 1968. Marvin has performed on stage almost exclusively with fiesta red Stratocasters since Richard's original purchase.

In Canada, Cliff Richard and the Shadows had top 10 hits, especially from 1961 to 1965. Canadian guitarists Randy Bachman and Neil Young credit Marvin as influential, Young penning the song "From Hank to Hendrix" on his Harvest Moon album in partial tribute.

"Hank Marvin" is rhyming slang for "starvin" ("starving"). This slang was referenced in a 2012 television advertisement for Mattessons meat company.

Early group personnel
 1956 Riverside Skiffle group Crescent City Skiffle Group: Marvin (banjo), John Tate (guitar), Derek Johnson (guitar), Joe Rankin (bass), Mal Malarky (mandolin), and Howard Muir (wb), John Clayton (guitar)
 1956–1957 The Railroaders (No. 1): Marvin (guitar), Welch (guitar), George Williams (guitar), John Clayton (guitar), Jim (drums)
 1956–1957 The Railroaders (No. 2): Marvin (guitar), Welch (guitar), Eddie Silver (guitar), George Williams (bass), and Jim ? (drums)
 1958 The Vipers (aka the Vipers Skiffle group) live concert: Wally Whyton (vocals), Johnny Booker (guitar), Hank Marvin (guitar), Jet Harris (bass) and Johnny Pilgrim (wb)
 1958 The Five Chesternuts 7" single ("Jean Dorothy" on Columbia): Gerry Hurst (vocals), Marvin (guitar), Welch (guitar), Neil Johnson (bass) and Pete Chester (drums)

UK solo tours
 1994 – w/Ben Marvin (guitar), Warren Bennett (guitar/keyboards), Mark Griffiths (bass), Brian Bennett (drums)
 1995 – w/Ben Marvin (guitar), Warren Bennett (guitar/keyboards), Mark Griffiths (bass), Matthew Letley (drums)
 1997 – w/Ben Marvin (guitar), Warren Bennett (guitar/keyboards), Mark Griffiths (bass), Matthew Letley (drums)
 1998 – w/Ben Marvin (guitar), Warren Bennett (guitar/keyboards), Mark Griffiths (bass), Matthew Letley (drums)
 2000 – w/Ben Marvin (guitar), Warren Bennett (guitar/keyboards), Mark Griffiths (bass), Peter May (drums)
 2002 – w/Ben Marvin (guitar), Warren Bennett (guitar/keyboards), Mark Griffiths (bass), Fergus Gerrand (drums)

Production credits
 Spaghetti Junction Work's Nice – If You Can Get It/Step Right Up Columbia DB 8935
 Des O'Connor – Another Side Des O'Connor – LP – NSPL 18559.
 Flair – Stop Look & Listen – LP – MLP 15611.
 Flair – Fair – LP – CC 227324
 Flair – Fair Play – LP – CC 327224

Duets and guest appearances
 1972: Spaghetti Junction Work's Nice – If You Can Get It/Step Right Up Columbia DB 8935
 1976: Evita: guitar on "Buenos Aires"
 1977: Dennis Waterman Waterman  (also features Brian Bennett)
 1977: Roger Daltrey One of the Boys  – guitar on "Parade" and "Leon"
 1978: Des O'Connor Another Side of Des O'Connor 
 1979: Wings Back to the Egg – "Rockestra Theme" and "So Glad to See You Here"
 1982: British Electric Foundation Music of Quality and Distinction Volume 1, guitar on "Anyone Who Had a Heart" with Sandie Shaw and "It's Over" with Billy MacKenzie
 1983: Tracey Ullman You Broke My Heart in 17 Places: guitar on "Move Over Darling" and "You Broke My Heart in 17 Places"
 1983: Leo Sayer Have You Ever Been in Love : guitar on "Don't Wait Until Tomorrow"
 1984: Shakin' Stevens "Teardrops" single
 1985: Dire Straits plays "Going Home" ("Local Hero's Theme"), with the band, as a special guest at Live at Wembley
 1986: Cliff Richard and The Young Ones "Living Doll" (UK charts No. 1)
 1988: Jean Michel Jarre Revolutions guitar on "London Kid" (UK charts No. 52)
 1989: Jean Michel Jarre Destination Docklands: guitar on "London Kid" and "Rendez-Vous IV"
 1992: Brian May We are the Champions Instrumental cover
 1995: Alan Jones A Shadow in Time album: guest on title track "A Shadow in Time"
 1998: Jane McDonald "You're My World" single
 2004: The Strat Pack: guitar on "The Rise and Fall of Flingel Bunt," "Sleep Walk" and "Apache"
 2005: Richard Hawley "I'm Absolutely Hank Marvin", B-side of "Coles Corner" single
 2007: Peter Frampton Fingerprints: guitar on "My Cup of Tea" (also features Brian Bennett)
 2007: Jean-Pierre Danel "Nivram" (French Charts No. 15, No. 8 Norway, No. 86 Germany) + Blues jam session on DVD
 2008: Jason Donovan "Let It Be Me" on Dreamboats and Petticoats 
 2008: Le QuecumBar Patrons "Stars of Gypsy Swing" ("Coquette", "Noto Swing")
 2010: Jean-Pierre Danel "M Appeal" (Norwegian charts No. 7, Finland No. 99)

Marvin also played guitar on the following tracks of library music recorded for Bruton Music:
 "Fighter Plane" (with Alan Hawkshaw) on Top of the Range
 "Conquest of Space" (with Alan Hawkshaw) on Grandiose Impressive Panoramic
 "Human Desert" (with Alan Hawkshaw) on Human Desert

Discography

See also

 List of guitarists
 List of people from Newcastle upon Tyne

References

External links
 
 Hank Marvin Interview NAMM Oral History Library (2019)

1941 births
20th-century composers
20th-century English singers
20th-century English writers
21st-century composers
21st-century English singers
21st-century English writers
Converts to Jehovah's Witnesses
English banjoists
English expatriates in Australia
English jazz guitarists
English male guitarists
English jazz pianists
English jazz singers
English rock guitarists
English rock pianists
English rock singers
English Jehovah's Witnesses
English multi-instrumentalists
English rock keyboardists
English male singer-songwriters
British rock and roll musicians
Expatriate musicians
Jazz banjoists
Living people
Musicians from Newcastle upon Tyne
Musicians from Western Australia
The Shadows members
Writers from Perth, Western Australia
Lead guitarists
British male pianists
British male jazz musicians